Lucius Israel Barber (October 7, 1806February 16, 1889) was an American medical doctor, Whig politician, and Wisconsin pioneer.  He served as Speaker of the House of Representatives of the Wisconsin Territory and later served in the Connecticut House of Representatives.  In historical documents his name is sometimes incorrectly given as Lucius J. Barber or L. J. Barber.  His last name is also sometimes spelled Barbour.

Biography
Barber was born in Simsbury, Connecticut, on October 7, 1806. He graduated from Amherst College and the University of Pennsylvania Medical College. In 1835, he moved to what would become the Wisconsin Territory, which at that time was part of the Michigan Territory, settling in Milwaukee. In 1839, he moved west to the newly-established Jefferson County, but in 1845 he returned to the state of Connecticut.  Barber died on February 16, 1889, in Simsbury, Connecticut.

Career
As a member of the Whig Party, Barber was elected to the Wisconsin Territorial Legislature from 1838 to 1839, representing Milwaukee County, and was chosen as Speaker of the Wisconsin Territorial House of Representatives during the 2nd session of the 2nd Wisconsin Territorial Assembly (1839). After moving to Jefferson County, he was elected to another term in the House of Representatives in 1840, and was then elected to the Wisconsin Territorial Council (upper house), serving from 1842 through 1844.

After moving back to Connecticut, he was elected to the Connecticut House of Representatives in 1850, and served as a probate judge from 1859 through 1869. Barber was also a historian and wrote books about the history of Simsbury, Connecticut.  He contributed the Simsbury portion of The Memorial History of Hartford County, Connecticut, 1633–1884 (1889).

Works

References

External links
 

People from Simsbury, Connecticut
Politicians from Milwaukee
People from Jefferson County, Wisconsin
Connecticut state court judges
Members of the Connecticut House of Representatives
Members of the Wisconsin Territorial Legislature
19th-century American politicians
Connecticut Whigs
Wisconsin Whigs
Amherst College alumni
Perelman School of Medicine at the University of Pennsylvania alumni
Writers from Connecticut
Writers from Milwaukee
1806 births
1889 deaths
19th-century American judges